The Liberty Outdoor Classic was the first regular-season professional basketball game played outdoors. It was played between the Indiana Fever and New York Liberty of the Women's National Basketball Association on July 19, 2008, as part of the 2008 Women's National Basketball Association regular-season schedule and the New York Liberty's home schedule. The game was held at Arthur Ashe Stadium, part of the USTA Billie Jean King National Tennis Center located within Flushing Meadows-Corona Park in Flushing, New York, and was the first non-tennis sporting event held in that venue. A portion of the proceeds from the game went to support the Breast Cancer Research Foundation

The Indiana Fever won the game 71–55. Janel McCarville led the scoring for the Liberty with 10 points, while Katie Douglas led the Fever with 20.

References
2008 Liberty Outdoor Classic at Arthur Ashe Stadium
Official Boxscore from 2008 Liberty Outdoor Classic
Liberty loses to Fever, 71-55, in Outdoor Classic at Arthur Ashe Stadium

See also
2008 WNBA season
NBA outdoor games

2008 WNBA season
New York Liberty
Indiana Fever